Arthur Laing (25 April 1892 – 24 November 1927) was a Scotland international rugby union player.

Rugby Union career

Amateur career

He went to the Royal High School of Edinburgh. He played rugby union and cricket for the school.

He played for Royal HSFP, and captained the side for a time; he played for the side before and after the Great War.

He played for the Army Rugby Union and competed in the Inter-Services tournament of 1919.

Provincial career

He played for Provinces District in their match against Anglo-Scots on 25 December 1913.

He played for Blues Trial against Whites Trial in their December 1913 match.

He played for Edinburgh District against Glasgow District in the 1920 inter-city match.

He played for Cities District on 11 December 1920.

He played for Scotland Probables on 10 January 1920 and on 8 January 1921 against Scotland Possibles.

International career

He played for Scotland 7 times in the period 1914 - 1921.

Military career

He joined the 4th Royal Scots Guards (Lothian Regiment), firstly as a private, but was then commissioned as a 2nd Lieutenant on 1915; and was acting captain for a time.

He moved to the South Staffordshire Regiment. He saw service in France; and was wounded in battle at Lens. He was mentioned in despatches.

Business career

Arthur became a brewer, along with his brother Herbert.

Family

His father Hector Laing (1862-1927) was a fish merchant. His mother was Agnes Yule.

They had 3 sons: Hector Stanley Laing (1890-1955), Herbert Laing, and Arthur.

Arthur Laing married Mary Cameron Stark (1891-1970) on 28 May 1918 at the Court House in Edinburgh.

Death

After his playing career ended he became a fan of the Royal HSFP side. A week before he died he watched his side play Kelvinside Academicals. The Scotsman newspaper of 26 November 1927 concluding: "It was there he probably got the chill that developed early in the week into pneumonia."

He died in a nursing home in Edinburgh.

References

1892 births
1927 deaths
Scottish rugby union players
Scotland international rugby union players
Edinburgh District (rugby union) players
Blues Trial players
Rugby union players from Edinburgh
Rugby union locks